Monsieur Papa is a 1977 French comedy film directed by Philippe Monnier and starring Claude Brasseur and Nathalie Baye. It is based on the novel Monsieur Papa by Patrick Cauvin.

Plot 
The story of the relationship between a father and his young son.

Cast 
 Claude Brasseur - Franck Lanier
 Nathalie Baye - Janine
 Nicolas Reboul - Laurent
 Daniel Auteuil - Dédé
 Brigitte Catillon - Martine
 Gérard Hérold - Bill
 Éva Darlan - Sylviane
 Michel Creton - Sport teacher
 Moustache - Gilles' father
 Josiane Balasko 
 François Dyrek 
 Jacqueline Doyen

References

External links 

1977 films
French comedy films
1977 comedy films
Gaumont Film Company films
1970s French-language films
1970s French films